The first season of the American television series NCIS: Los Angeles premiered on CBS on September 22, 2009, and concluded on May 25, 2010. It is the first spin-off series of NCIS. The series is set in Los Angeles, California, and follows the stories of the members of the Office of Special Projects, an undercover division of the Naval Criminal Investigative Service (NCIS). The show and its characters were introduced during the sixth-season episodes of NCIS titled "Legend (Part I)" and "Legend (Part II)". These episodes served as a backdoor pilot for the series.

Season one was originally planned to have thirteen episodes. On October 7, 2009, after rating as the most watched new show of the Fall 2009 U.S. television season, CBS ordered a full set of 22 episodes, which was extended to 24 episodes on November 4, 2009.

NCIS: Los Angeles ranked #9 most watched series for the 2009-10 U.S. TV season with a total of 16.08 million viewers.

Crew
The first season was produced by CBS Television Studios and Shane Brennan Productions and aired on the CBS network. The series was created by Shane Brennan as a spin-off from NCIS, which was created by Donald P. Bellisario. Brennan and R. Scott Gemmill served as executive producers. The writers were Brennan, Gemmill, Dave Kalstein, Gil Grant, Speed Weed, Lindsay Sturman, Tim Clemente, Joseph C. Wilson, and Matt Pyken. Brennan served as the season's showrunner.

Cast and characters

Main 
 Chris O'Donnell as G. Callen, NCIS Senior Special Agent (SSA) for the Office of Special Projects (O.S.P.) in Los Angeles
 Peter Cambor as Dr. Nate Getz, NCIS Operational Psychologist And Special Agent 
 Daniela Ruah as Kensi Blye, NCIS Junior Field Agent
 Adam Jamal Craig as Dominic Vail, NCIS Junior Field Agent 
 Barrett Foa as Eric Beale, NCIS Technical Operator
 Linda Hunt as Henrietta Lange, NCIS SSA and Operations Manager of the O.S.P.
 LL Cool J as Sam Hanna, NCIS Senior Field Agent, second in command

Recurring 
 Eric Christian Olsen as Marty Deeks, LAPD Detective
 Rocky Carroll as Leon Vance, NCIS Director stationed in Washington, D.C.
 Kathleen Rose Perkins as Rose Schwartz, M.E Doctor in Los Angeles
 Pauley Perrette as Abigail Sciuto, Forensic Specialist for NCIS in D.C. (Special Guest from NCIS)
 Brian Avers as Mike Renko, NCIS Special Agent and former member of the O.S.P. and Callen's team
 Ronald Auguste as Mohad "Moe" Dusa
 Vyto Ruginis as Arkady Kolcheck

Guest appearances 
 Kelly Hu as Lee Wuan Kai, NCIS target 
 David Dayan Fisher as Trent Kort, CIA Agent
 Brandon Scott as Marine LCPL. Alex Walder

Overview 
The first season had 7 actors get star billing. Chris O'Donnell portrayed G. Callen, an NCIS Special Agent in charge of the Office of Special Projects team in Los Angeles. Though his friends call him "G" he does not know what his first name is. LL Cool J portrays Sam Hanna, a former Navy SEAL working as a Senior NCIS agent. Sam is G's partner and is very curious about his past. Kensi Blye portrayed by Daniela Ruah, a Junior Field agent on the NCIS Office of Special Projects who comes from a Marine family, studied forensics and criminology in college, and is fluent in Portuguese, lip reading, and Morse code. Adam Jamal Craig portrayed Dominic "Dom" Vail, the team's rookie agent. After his character disappeared in the episode "Missing" he was changed to a guest star. He was written out of the show in the episode "Found" when Dom was fatally wounded while trying to escape from his kidnappers. Peter Cambor portrayed Dr. Nathaniel "Nate" Getz, the operational psychologist working with NCIS observing surveillance tapes and watching or conducting interrogations in order to create psychological profiles of suspects. Nate briefly expressed interest in doing field work but was dissuaded by everyone on the team. Barrett Foa portrayed Eric Beale, the technical operator for the OSP who serves as the primary contact both for agents in the field and with Director Leon Vance. Foa was changed from guest starring to a starring role as of the thirteenth episode of the season. Linda Hunt portrayed Henrietta "Hetty" Lange, the Operations Manager at NCIS in Los Angeles. Hetty has been compared to the character Q in the James Bond novels and films. She guest-starred in the first episode before being upgraded as a series regular the following episode.

Rocky Carroll had a recurring role as Leon Vance, the Director of NCIS. 

Brian Avers appeared in three episodes as Special Agent Mike Renko; Pauley Perrette appeared in two episodes as Abby Sciuto, the forensic specialist at NCIS headquarters. Eric Christian Olsen guest starred in two episodes as Marty Deeks, the NCIS / LAPD Liaison Officer.

Episodes

Reception

Critic reception 
NCIS: Los Angeles first season received mixed to positive reviews from television critics. On Rotten Tomatoes, the season holds a 65% approval rating.

Awards and nominations

Ratings
The series premiere episode, "Identity", drew approximately 18.73 million viewers with a 4.4/11 share in the 18- to 49-year-old demographic and therefore won its timeslot. It was the second most watched show of the week, behind the seventh season premiere of sister show NCIS which accumulated 20.61 million viewers. However, ratings were down from the ninth season premiere of CSI: Crime Scene Investigation from the previous year, but was higher than the seventh and final season premiere of Without a Trace, which occupied the same timeslot during the 2008-09 television season. The season finale, "Callen, G." was watched by 13.1 million viewers. For its first season, NCIS: Los Angeles was the 9th most watched new series on CBS with a total of 16.08 million viewers.

Notes

Home video release

References

General

External links
  at CBS

2009 American television seasons
2010 American television seasons
01